The Key West Historic District (also known as Old Town of the City of Key West) is a U.S. historic district (designated as such on March 11, 1971) located in Key West, Florida. It encompasses approximately 4000 acres (16 km²), bounded by White, Angela, Windsor, Passover, Thomas and Whitehead Streets, and the Gulf of Mexico. It contains 187 historic buildings and one structure.

On February 24, 1983, the district was expanded to 5400 acres (22 km²), bounded by Emma, Whitehead, White, and South Streets, Mallory Square, and the Atlantic Ocean, to contain 2485 historic buildings and four structures.

Old Town is the name given to the historic district of the island of Key West, Florida.  It is roughly the western half of the island.  It is also where the central business district and majority of tourist attractions are located.

Points of interest
Key West Aquarium
The Armory
Oldest House Museum and Gardens
Audubon House and Tropical Gardens
Basilica of St. Mary Star of the Sea
Captain Tony's Saloon
Key West Cemetery
U.S. Coast Guard Headquarters, Key West Station
Ernest Hemingway House
Key West Heritage House Museum and Robert Frost Cottage
Key West Light
Mallory Square
Mel Fisher Maritime Heritage Museum
Birthplace of Pan-Am
Dr. Joseph Y. Porter House
Fogarty Mansion
Key West Museum of Art and History
Key West Shipwreck Historeum Museum
Sloppy Joe's
Richard Peacon House
Southernmost House
Thompson Fish House, Turtle Cannery and Kraals
Harry S. Truman Little White House
Western Union (schooner)

Gallery

External links
 Florida's Office of Cultural and Historical Programs - Monroe County
 National Register of Historic Places - Monroe County listings"

Historic
National Register of Historic Places in Key West, Florida
Historic
Historic districts on the National Register of Historic Places in Florida